Gary Maurice "Joyner" Lucas Jr. (born August 17, 1988) is an American rapper, singer and songwriter. Lucas first received widespread exposure and critical acclaim after the release of his single "Ross Capicchioni" in 2015. In June 2017, he released his fourth mixtape, 508-507-2209, which was his first on a major label. In November 2017, Lucas released his single "I'm Not Racist", which quickly went viral, gaining him further mainstream attention. The video was nominated for the Grammy Award for Best Music Video at the 61st Grammy Awards. Lucas is signed to Griselda Records, a label he's been signed to since 2019. Since 2016, Lucas has also become known for remixing popular hip hop songs like "Gucci Gang" by Lil Pump, "Bank Account" by 21 Savage, "DNA" by Kendrick Lamar and many others. In October 2018, he announced his debut studio album ADHD, which was released in 2020.

Outside of music, Lucas co-founded the music technology platform, Tully in 2015, with manager Dhruv Joshi.

Early life
Gary Maurice Lucas Jr. was born on August 17, 1988, in Worcester, Massachusetts. He began rapping at the age of 10 and attended South High Community School in Worcester.

Career

2007–2017: Early beginnings, record deal, and 508-507-2209
Joyner Lucas first started rapping under the name G-Storm, but by 2007 had changed his stage name to Future Joyner and started working with his cousin Cyrus tha Great, forming a group called Film Skool Rejekts. That year they released Workprint: The Greatest Mixtape of All Time. Lucas released his first solo mixtape, titled Listen to Me, in 2011. After rapper Future came to prominence, Lucas dropped the "Future" from his name and continued as Joyner Lucas. He released his first mixtape under this new moniker in 2013, titled LFO's (Low Frequency Oscillators). His next mixtape, Along Came Joyner, was released on April 5, 2015. This mixtape contained his critically acclaimed "Ross Capicchioni". Following the success of the song, Lucas was featured in the 2015 BET Hip-Hop Awards Cypher. Originally intended to appear in the online-only cypher, he was later promoted to rap as part of the live broadcast cyphers based on the strength of his initial performance.

Lucas signed to Atlantic Records on September 21, 2016. Lucas went on to release a project titled 508-507-2209 on June 16, 2017, with Atlantic Records. The mixtape charted at #7 on the Heatseekers Albums chart on Billboard and contained the singles "I'm Sorry", "Ultrasound", "Just Like You" and "Winter Blues". Ever since 2016, Lucas has also become known for remixing popular hip hop songs.

On November 28, 2017, Lucas released the single "I'm Not Racist" via his YouTube channel. The music video quickly went viral and gained critical acclaim. The controversial song is about race and society, and race relations from the perspectives of a white man and a black man. The video was nominated for the Grammy Award for Best Music Video at the 61st Grammy Awards, but lost to Childish Gambino's "This Is America". Lucas and Chris Brown announced a collaborative project titled Angels & Demons on February 25, 2018, with the project's first single "Stranger Things" releasing the following day. On April 1, 2018, Lucas released the single "Frozen", a song focused on different forms of reckless driving. The second single from the Angels and Demons collaborative mixtape, "I Don't Die", was released on May 2.

On December 24, 2018 it was announced that Lucas departed from Atlantic Records.

2018–2020: ADHD, and Evolution
On July 31, 2018, Lucas announced that he was forced to cancel appearances in the Australian and European legs of his I'm Kind of a Big Deal tour due to hoarseness and laryngitis. A month later, Lucas was featured on "Lucky You" from Eminem's tenth album, Kamikaze. The song debuted at number 6 on the Billboard Hot 100, marking Lucas' first top 10 entry on the chart. On October 12, 2018, Lucas announced that he would be releasing his debut studio album entitled ADHD. He also announced a single from the album that would be released the following Wednesday. The song, entitled "I Love", was released as the lead single from ADHD, which was released on March 27, 2020. It was preceded by nine singles from October 2018 to March 2020, the time before release.

On August 17, 2020, Lucas announced the release date of his debut EP, Evolution. It was released on October 23, 2020. It was preceded by two singles, "Fall Slowly" featuring Ashanti and "Snitch".

2021–present: Ramen & OJ, Your Heart, Movie Shoot and Not Now, I'm Busy
On April 30, 2021, Lucas released the single "Ramen & OJ" with Lil Baby as the lead single from his upcoming second studio album. It was accompanied by a music video. Lucas contributed a song titled "Shoot My Shot" to the Space Jam: A New Legacy soundtrack.

Throughout 2021, Lucas released a number of singles. Most notably Your Heart with J. Cole, which was released on September 24, 2021 and accompanied by a music video. Lucas also collaborated with other notable rappers, including Lil Durk on the song "Rambo", released on December 3, 2021, Lil Tjay on the song "Dreams Unfold", released on August 25, 2021 and Ty Dolla $ign on the song "Late to the Party", released on October 8, 2021 and accompanied by a music video. Solo singles "Duck Duck Goose", released on October 29, 2021 and "My Escape", released on December 17, 2021 were also accompanied by music videos.

On June 4, 2022, Lucas uploaded a photo to social media of him in the studio with the caption 'Working on new album....'. That was interrupted however by the announcement on October 29, 2022 that Lucas would be shooting a movie with good friend and fellow Boston native Mark Wahlberg.

On March 8, 2023, Lucas uploaded to social media, announcing that the cover art for his upcoming studio album would be released the following day and that "Devils Work 2", an upcoming single from the project and the sequel to the original song from his debut album ADHD, would be released on Friday, March 10. On March 9, 2023 the cover art was released, revealing the albums title to be 'Not Now, I'm Busy'.

Artistry
Lucas has cited several artists as influences in his music, but he cites Eminem as his biggest musical influence. Eminem himself actually considers Lucas to be one of the greatest rappers of all time. He also revealed he was influenced by Will Smith in his song "Will", which he would release a remix of featuring Will Smith himself on May 15, 2020. He cites Jay-Z as one of his influences too.

Personal life
Joyner Lucas shares a son named Joyner Messiah Lucas (born February 20, 2016) with Carmen Julissa Ayala, with whom he had an off and on romantic relationship. Lucas tells the story of his son's conception in his song "Forever" on his mixtape 508-507-2209. Joyner Messiah Lucas is loved and adored by his father and referenced in many of his songs. He has also made cameos in his father's music videos. Most recently he played Will Smith's son Jaden Smith in the video of "Will".

Lucas has revealed that the title of his album ADHD comes from the fact that he was diagnosed with ADHD as a child. He explained that people surrounding him, including his own parents, made him feel like he was not normal and treated him differently as a result. Eventually, he would act out, bullying other classmates, failing classes, and get sent to an alternative school after expulsion.

Feuds

Logic
According to Lucas, when he was on Tech N9ne's tour bus, he heard some records from Tech's album The Storm. Lucas expressed interest on collaborating with Logic on the song "Sriracha" and felt that he could add to the display of fast-flow rapping, and Tech acquiesced. Logic was originally slated to be the only feature on "Sriracha", but when he spent over six months to deliver his verse, Lucas hopped on the track to offer his own. Joyner stated that when they got the record back, he could tell that Logic was not "too happy" about him being on the track once he heard it. On his remix of Future's "Mask Off", Joyner, unhappy by the work Logic turned in after taking nearly half a year to edit his verse, directly addressed the disappointing display. Both he and Tech N9ne were upset with Logic for not emulating the style of quick flow on the song.

After Logic's hit song "1-800-273-8255" peaked at number three on the Billboard Hot 100, Joyner Lucas immediately took offense and argued that the track was named in order to bring direct competition to his song, "I'm Sorry" from his album 508-507-2209. In a later interview, he called Logic "corny" and in another incident, he said that he thinks that Logic "can rap" but feels like "he tries to prove that he's black too much for me." With both Logic's single and Lucas' mixtape dealing with the issue of mental health representation and resource allocation, Lucas was careful to not slam the track too hard.

When Logic dropped his song "Yuck" from his mixtape Bobby Tarantino II in March 2018, the veiled diss inside the song was quickly spotted by Lucas and his fans, despite Logic saying that there was no diss in the song. Seemingly nonplussed by the insult, Lucas dared Logic to call him out directly on Twitter. That same month, Joyner took aim at Logic's song "44 More" and his album Everybody on his remix of BlocBoy JB's "Look Alive".

In 2019, the two rappers ended their feud, which was revealed when Logic made a guest appearance on Joyner Lucas' song "ISIS", the third single from ADHD. Lucas kept the name of the collaborator a secret until he released the song.

Hopsin
In September 2018, when a fan asked rapper Hopsin on Twitter who would win in a rap battle between him and Joyner Lucas, Hopsin replied, "That's a dumb question that I'm sure you already know the answer to." Not long after, Lucas commented, "Hold up. @Hopsin wtf is that supposed to mean???" In his response, Hopsin stated that he would "b[r]eak his soul" and also dissed Logic in the comment. This dispute would prove to be short-lived, when in less than two days Hopsin shared a screenshot of a FaceTime call with Lucas, indicating that they finally made peace, but still wanted people to consider who would beat the other in a rap battle.

Tory Lanez
On November 19, 2018, Lanez claimed that he was a better rapper than Joyner Lucas on an Instagram Live session. Incredulous, Lucas immediately responded by inviting Lanez to a battle rapping challenge and telling him to let the public decide who is better. The next day, Lanez dropped a freestyle over Eminem's "Lucky You", of which Lucas made a guest appearance on. In less than 24 hours, Joyner responded with his freestyle over "Litty" by Meek Mill featuring Tory Lanez, also targeting rapper Trippie Redd, who joined Tory's Instagram Live and slandered Joyner's name as well. Shortly after, Lanez retaliated with his own freestyle of "Litty", titled "Litty Again", taking shots at Joyner's collaboration with Eminem. Lucas' answer song was a freestyle of Kodak Black's "Zeze". On the track, he mentions Tory's being accused of plagiarism in 2016, when listeners noticed that the ending of Lanez's song "4am Flex" was similar to Kendrick Lamar's "The Art of Peer Pressure". Joyner also accuses him of copying rapper Don Q's flow on his 2017 Funkmaster Flex freestyle. On November 23, Tory posted on Instagram a video of him declaring victory in the feud and celebrating. Displeased, Lucas reposted the video with his own comment, with a reference to Lanez as a singer.

The end of this rivalry was made public on August 8, 2019, when Joyner Lucas and Tory Lanez collaborated on their remix of "Suge" by DaBaby.

Awards and nominations

Grammy Awards
The Grammy Awards are held annually by the National Academy of Recording Arts and Sciences. Joyner has two Grammy nominations altogether.

|-
| rowspan="2" | 2019
| "I'm Not Racist"
| Best Music Video
| 
|-
| "Lucky You"
| Best Rap Song
| 
|-

Discography

Studio albums

Extended plays

Mixtapes

Collaborative mixtapes

Singles

As lead artist

Notes

As featured artist

Other charted songs

Remixes
 Desiigner – "Panda" (titled "Kill The Panda")
 Nas, Dave East, Lin-Manuel Miranda and Aloe Blacc – "Wrote My Way Out" (with Royce da 5'9, Black Thought, Lin-Manuel Miranda and Aloe Blacc)
 Future – "Mask Off" (titled "Mask On")
 Kendrick Lamar – "DNA"
 Lil Pump – "Gucci Gang"
 21 Savage – "Bank Account"
 BlocBoy JB and Drake – "Look Alive"
 Meek Mill and Tory Lanez – "Litty"
 Kodak Black, Travis Scott and Offset – "Zeze"
 DaBaby – "Suge" (with Tory Lanez)
 XXXTentacion – "NorthStar (Remix)" 
 Joyner Lucas – "Lotto" (with Yandel and G-Eazy)
 Joyner Lucas – "Will" (with Will Smith)
 Jack Harlow - "What's Poppin" (titled "What's Gucci")
 Pooh Shiesty & Lil Durk - "Back in Blood"
 Joyner Lucas & Logic - "ISIS" (with Starringo, Catra, Lex Bratcher & Kvng Moses)

Guest appearances

References

External links
 
 

1988 births
Living people
Musicians from Worcester, Massachusetts
People with attention deficit hyperactivity disorder
African-American male rappers
21st-century American singers
Rappers from Massachusetts
East Coast hip hop musicians
21st-century American rappers
21st-century American male singers
21st-century African-American musicians
20th-century African-American people
Hardcore hip hop artists